Kani Kowtar (also Romanized as Kānī Kowtar) is a village in Akhtachi-ye Gharbi Rural District, in the Central District of Mahabad County, West Azerbaijan Province, Iran. At the 2006 census, its population was 110, in 19 families.

References 

Populated places in Mahabad County